is a 1972 Japanese drama film directed by Yoji Yamada and co-written by Yamada and Akira Miyazaki. Set on a small island in the Seto Inland Sea, the film follows the struggles of Seichi and Minko, a couple making a living by transporting rocks by boat and dumping them at construction sites. The film addresses their precarious livelihood and vanishing way of life.

Cast
 Hisashi Igawa as Seiichi Ishizaki
 Chieko Baisho as Tamiko Ishizaki
 Chishū Ryū as Senzô Ishizaki
 Gin Maeda
 Mayumi Ito
 Kiyoshi Atsumi

Reception
In 1973 Hisashi Igawa received the Best Actor Award at the Kinema Junpo Awards, for his role in the film.

The Japan Society describes it as one of Yamada's seminal films.

The film was reviewed by the British Federation of Film Societies. In the journal Film Criticism, it was stated that the film "is virtually a companion piece to The Family."

References

External links
 

Japanese drama films
1972 films
Films directed by Yoji Yamada
Films with screenplays by Yôji Yamada